News Nation is an Indian free to air Hindi news television channel. News Nation is owned by News Nation Network Pvt Ltd.

History
“News Nation” is an Indian Hindi-language news channel owned and promoted by News Nation Network Pvt Ltd which is one of the most successful media groups in India.

The network has a bouquet of three TV channels – News Nation, a national Channel in Hindi, and two regional channels News State (Uttar Pradesh & Uttarakhand) and News State (Madhya Pradesh & Chhattisgarh). The network plans to expand its regional offering across India and is soon coming with two more regional news channel News State (Bihar & Jharkhand) and News State (Maharashtra & Goa).

News Nation:
Since its launch in Feb 2013, News Nation has surpassed long-established Hindi news channels and has cemented its position among the top channels of the Hindi News genre.

News State Uttar Pradesh/Uttarakhand:
News State Uttar Pradesh/Uttarakhand is News Nation Network's first regional Hindi News Channel. It has the largest network of reporters and covers hyper-local news from all 88 districts of Uttar Pradesh and Uttarakhand, besides covering major stories from major cities and towns. Since its launch, in February 2014, it has maintained its position as the No.1 channel in terms of viewership as per BARC ratings.

News State Madhya Pradesh/ Chhattisgarh:
In March 2018, News Nation Network launched its second regional Hindi News Channel, News State Madhya Pradesh/Chhattisgarh. Since its launch, it surpassed many established regional and is amongst the Top regional Hindi News channels of Madhya Pradesh & Chhattisgarh as per BARC Ratings.

In September 2022, journalist Anil Yadav resigned from the channel saying that there is pressure from the Uttar Pradesh government to cover up government scams, to run shows which have a "Hindu-Muslim agenda" and criticize only the politicians of other parties. He further alleged that the channel gets Rs 17-18 crore a year from the government and that's why News Nation can't report against the BJP.

Network availability
News Nation is available on the following networks:
 DEN UP
 DEN Delhi
 DEN Rajasthan
 DEN Maharashtra & Gujarat
 NXT Hits Digital
 Siti Cable
 Digi Cable Mumbai
 Digi Cable MP
 Digi Cable Jalpur
 Dish TV
 GTPL
 Hathway
 Airtel
 d2h
 DD Free Dish
 Fastway Digital
 Tata Sky
 ABS Free Dish

See also 
 List of television stations in India
 Dharma Productions
 Karan Johar

References

24-hour television news channels in India
 Hindi-language television channels in India
Hindi-language television stations